Lončarević is a Croatian, Montenegrin and Serbian surname. Lončarević is a brotherhood from Montenegro, they moved to Zatrijebač (Kuči Tribe), from the Bjelica Tribe, Katunska Nahija, where the Lončarević family originated from, originating from the Milić brotherhood. As it was further stated, according to that tradition, three brothers went from Pleme Bjelica to Zatrijebač, Kuči, because of the possible revenge of the Ottomans due to the attack on the Turkish columns, where one of them "departed" and stayed in Zatrijebač, the other turned to the Turks, and the third kept his faith. From the one who stayed in Zatrijepč, there are the Bankanjis, from this Turkified in Gusunj are the Bekteševići, and from the third brother, who did not want to check, come the Lončarevići, who are also called Milići, after the oldest name.

Dženan Lončarević (born 1975), Serbian pop singer
Ilija Lončarević (born 1944), Croatian football coach 
Đuro Lončarević (born 1920 - 1987) general of JNA and Yugoslavian national hero.

References

Serbian surnames
Croatian surnames
Occupational surnames
Patronymic surnames